Anisopodus longipes is a species of beetle in the family Cerambycidae that was described by Linsley & Chemsak in 1966.

References

Anisopodus
Beetles described in 1966